Kateřina Razýmová (née Beroušková, born 10 September 1991) is a Czech cross-country skier who competes internationally.

She competed for the Czech Republic at the FIS Nordic World Ski Championships 2017 in Lahti, Finland.

Cross-country skiing results
All results are sourced from the International Ski Federation (FIS).

Olympic Games

World Championships

World Cup

Season standings

References 

1991 births
Living people
Czech female cross-country skiers
Tour de Ski skiers
Cross-country skiers at the 2018 Winter Olympics
Olympic cross-country skiers of the Czech Republic
Competitors at the 2015 Winter Universiade
People from Domažlice
Sportspeople from the Plzeň Region